Orientornis is an extinct species of ratite from the Miocene of China.

Description
Remains of a pelvis, including a synsacrum, were recovered from mudstone in the Linxia Basin, Guanghe County, Gansu Province, northwest China. Based on the size of these remains, it is believed to have been slightly larger than Struthio camelus. When this bird lived, the area is believed to have been either open grasslands or wetlands.

Taxonomy
Orientornis was originally named as a species of Struthio, S. linxiaensis, by Hou et al. (2005). However, Wang (2008) placed the taxon in its own genus, Orientornis.

Footnotes

References
 

Miocene birds
Extinct flightless birds
Struthioniformes
Neogene birds of Asia
Fossil taxa described in 2008